Robert Robinson may refer to:

Politicians 
Robert Robinson (Australian politician) (1811–1852), Australian politician
Robert Robinson (Canadian politician) (1826–1885), Canadian merchant and politician in New Brunswick
Robert E. Robinson (1947–1989), Savannah City Council member and attorney
Robert P. Robinson (Delaware politician) (1869–1939), American banker and politician, Governor of Delaware
Robert P. Robinson (Wisconsin politician) (1884–1953), Wisconsin State Senator
Robert Thomson Robinson (1867–1926), Australian politician

Sportsmen 
Robert Robinson (cricketer, born 1765) (1765–1822), English cricketer
Robert Robinson (footballer, born 1871) (1871–?), 	Robert Breckell Robinson, English association footballer, played for Ardwick (Manchester City)
Bob Robinson (American football) (fl. 1916), American football coach
Robert Robinson (footballer) (1906–1990), English association footballer
Bob Robinson (Australian footballer) (1914–2001), Australian rules footballer
Bob Robinson (footballer, born 1910) (1910–1989), English football goalkeeper
Jackie Robinson (basketball, born 1927) (Robert Lloyd Jackson Robinson), American basketball player
Rob Robinson (ice hockey) (born 1967), Canadian ice hockey player
Rob Robinson (American football) (born 1977), American football coach
Bob Robinson (wrestler) (born 1958), Canadian former wrestler
Robert Robinson (cricketer, born 1924) (1924–1973), English cricketer
Robert Robinson (rower), New Zealand rower
Ginney Robinson (Robert Robinson), American baseball player

Others 
Robert Robinson (painter) (1651–1706), English mezzotint engraver, painter, and stage designer, see Johann Jacob Haid
Robert Robinson (phonetician) (c. 1600–c. 1660), English phonetician
Robert Robinson (Dissenting minister) (1726–1791), controversial Unitarian Minister
Robert Robinson (Baptist) (1735–1790), Baptist Minister and scholar of Cambridge
Robert Spencer Robinson (1809–1889), British naval officer
Robert Robinson (chemist) (1886–1975), British chemist, Nobel laureate
Robert G. Robinson (1896–1974), American US Marine Corps First Lieutenant, Medal of Honor recipient
Robert Robinson (engineer) (1907–1994), lived in the Soviet Union
Robert Robinson (broadcaster) (1927–2011), British broadcaster
Robert Robinson (Neighbours), fictional character in 2006–2007
Robert Anthony Robinson (1904–1979), New Zealand inorganic chemist

See also
Bobby Robinson (disambiguation)
Robbie Robinson (disambiguation)
Bob Robison, American canoeist